The Tuscan regional election of 1995 took place on 23 April 1995.

For the first time the President of the Region was directly elected by the people, although the election was not yet binding and the President-elect could have been replaced during the term.

Electoral system
Regional elections in Tuscany were ruled by the "Tatarella law" (approved in 1995), which provided for a mixed electoral system: four fifths of the regional councilors were elected in provincial constituencies by proportional representation, using the largest remainder method with a droop quota and open lists, while the residual votes and the unassigned seats were grouped into a "single regional constituency", where the whole ratios and the highest remainders were divided with the Hare method among the provincial party lists; one fifth of the council seats instead was reserved for regional lists and assigned with a majoritarian system: the leader of the regional list that scored the highest number of votes was elected to the presidency of the Region while the other candidates were elected regional councilors.

A threshold of 3% had been established for the provincial lists, which, however, could still have entered the regional council if the regional list to which they were connected had scored at least 5% of valid votes.

The panachage was also allowed: the voter can indicate a candidate for the presidency but prefer a provincial list connected to another candidate.

Parties and candidates

Results
In the context of the profound political changes that invested Italy between 1992 and 1994, Italian Parliament changed the regional electoral law, adapting them to new majoritarian principle now in vogue in the country, trim and tend bipolar politics. The new political geography, however, did not fit properly to Tuscany where, besides a garrison of right, assumed insignificant importance the presence of Umberto Bossi's Northern League, which, instead of the others regions, substained the centre-left candidate. Another major innovation had originated in Tuscany: Silvio Berlusconi' party, Forza Italia, had collected anti-Communist orphans of deceased traditional parties.

The central political alliances had not been followed up at Tuscany, with the Communist Refoundation Party in sharp contrast with PDS because of the contrast into the old party of PCI. PRC accused the PDS and at the same time the Northern League accused Forza Italia to be the trojan horse for the recycling of the old political class, had led to the arrest of the Northern League's electoral steady ascent, if not also a marked reflux into the consent of the federalist party. Soparadoxically, the Northern League substained Chiti.

Election on April 23 saw the success of the broad leftist coalition, grouping progressive ex-Christian Democrats, ex-socialist, ex-communist and greens, and led to presidency Vannino Chiti that, with the majority premium, was able to give life to the first council in the history of the region that managed to last the entire legislature.

1995 elections in Italy
1995 regional election
April 1995 events in Europe
1995